In politics, war of ideas is a confrontation among the ideologies that nations and political groups use to promote at their domestic and foreign interests. In a war of ideas, the battle space is the public mind, the belief of the peoples who compose the population, for whom ideological conflict is about winning the hearts and minds of the people. 

Waging a war of ideas can involve think tanks, television programs, journalism articles (newspaper, magazine, weblogs), government policies, and public diplomacy. 

In the monograph: 'Wars of Ideas and The War of Ideas''' (2008), Antulio J. Echevarria defined the war of ideas as:
 

History of the concept

Richard M. Weaver published Ideas Have Consequences in 1948 by the University of Chicago Press. The book is largely a treatise on the harmful effects of nominalism on Western civilization since that doctrine gained prominence in the High Middle Ages, followed by a prescription of a course of action through which Weaver believes the West might be rescued from its decline. Weaver attributes the beginning of the Western decline to the adoption of nominalism (or the rejection of the notion of absolute truth) in the late Scholastic period.

In 1993, Heritage Foundation analyst James A. Phillips used the term "war of ideas" in describing the pivotal role played by the National Endowment for Democracy (NED) in the ideological battle for the protection of democracy. Phillips defended the NED as "an important weapon in the war of ideas," against communist dictatorships in control of China, Cuba, North Korea, and Vietnam. In a Cato Institute Foreign Policy brief, it was argued that there was no longer a need for the NED because "the democratic West has won the war of ideas against its communist adversaries." Gingrich declared,

"By the 1990s the term "war of ideas" was used to polarize debates on economic systems with socialism and central planning on one end of the spectrum and free enterprise and private property on the other."

In 2008, Antulio J. Echevarria, in his monograph entitled Wars of Ideas and the War of Ideas, "offers a brief examination of four common types of wars of ideas, and analyzes how the US, its allies and strategic partners might proceed in the war of ideas." While he feels that a better understanding of these differences between wars of ideas can inform strategy, Echevarria "concludes that physical events, whether designed or incidental, are in some respects more important to the course and outcome of a war of ideas than the ideas themselves."

In a New York Times Magazine series commemorating the 10th anniversary of the September 11 attacks, a round table was held bringing together Paul Berman, Scott Malcomson, James Traub, David Rieff, Ian Burama and Michael Ignatieff. Malcomson observed,

Intellectual debates as wars of ideas
Intellectual debates spiral into wars of ideas when academic concepts of neutrality and objectivity are abandoned and issues devolve into embittered and divisive disputes. Echevarria argued (2008) that in the United States topics such as abortion, intelligent design and evolution are wars of ideas. When an intellectual debate devolves into a war of ideas

Echevarria uses Kuhn's controversial incommensurability thesis as a claim to relativism and therefore a defense of engagement in the war of ideas. Thomas Samuel Kuhn (1922–1996), one of the most influential twentieth century philosophers of science, published The Structure of Scientific Revolutions (1962), one of the most cited publications, in which he developed the thesis of incommensurability thesis. He argued that, "theories from differing periods suffer from certain deep kinds of failure of comparability." The central idea is that the development of science is driven by adherence to paradigms. If a particular paradigm cannot solve an anomaly, a crisis in science may result. An existing paradigm may be superseded by a rival paradigm. There may be no common measure for assessing the competing scientific theories. They are 'incommensurable'.

A common misinterpretation of paradigms is the belief that the discovery of paradigm shifts and the dynamic nature of science (with its many opportunities for subjective judgments by scientists) are a case for relativism: the view that all kinds of belief systems are equal. Kuhn vehemently denies this interpretation and states that when a scientific paradigm is replaced by a new one, albeit through a complex social process, the new one is always better, not just different.

These claims of relativism are, however, tied to another claim that Kuhn does at least somewhat endorse: that the language and theories of different paradigms cannot be translated into one another or rationally evaluated against one another — that they are incommensurable. This gave rise to much talk of different peoples and cultures having radically different worldviews or conceptual schemes — so different that whether or not one was better, they could not be understood by one another. However, the philosopher Donald Davidson published a highly regarded essay in 1974, "On the Very Idea of a Conceptual Scheme" (Proceedings and Addresses of the American Philosophical Association, Vol. 47, (1973-1974), pp. 5–20) arguing that the notion that any languages or theories could be incommensurable with one another was itself incoherent. If this is correct, Kuhn's claims must be taken in a weaker sense than they often are. Furthermore, the hold of the Kuhnian analysis on social science has long been tenuous with the wide application of multi-paradigmatic approaches in order to understand complex human behaviour (see for example John Hassard, Sociology and Organization Theory: Positivism, Paradigm and Postmodernity. Cambridge University Press, 1993, .)

In U.S. politics

According to political scientist Andrew Rich, author of Think Tanks, Public Policy, and the Politics of Expertise  The "war of ideas" is "fundamentally a battle between liberals and conservatives, progressives and libertarians, over the appropriate role for government."

Thomas E. Mann and Norm Ornstein claim that the dysfunctionality of American politics is worse than it has ever been. "The partisan and ideological polarization from which we now suffer comes at a time when critical problems cry out for resolution, making for a particularly toxic mix."

Bruce Thornton of the Hoover Institute argues that polarization is good for democracy and that "bipartisan compromise is deeply over-rated."

Darrell West, the vice president and director of governance studies at the Brookings Institution claims that we are living in "parallel political universes seemingly unable to comprehend or deal with each other." "Compromise has become a dirty word among many news reporters, voters, and advocacy organizations, and this limits leaders' capacity to address important policy problems." This makes it difficult for leaders to "lead and govern effectively". Those outside of government, such as "individuals, advocacy groups, businesses, and the news media" must recognize how "their own behaviors hinder leadership and make it difficult for elected and administrative officials to bargain and negotiate." Policy-making today is "plagued by extreme partisan polarization". News coverage does not inform civic discussions. There is a lack of political civility. Political practices discourage compromise, bargaining, and negotiation.

In Canadian politics

Tom Flanagan observed that Calgary School political science professors, Barry Cooper, Ted Morton, Rainer Knopff and history professor David Bercuson and their students Stephen Harper, Ezra Levant played an 'honourable part" in helping conservatives win "the war of ideas" in Canada.

In US foreign policy

There are two principal schools of thought on how to approach the war of ideas. The first approach advocates treating the conflict as a matter best addressed through public diplomacy—defined as the conveyance of information across a broad spectrum to include cultural affairs and political action. Accordingly, this view calls for revitalizing or transforming the U.S. Department of State and many of the traditional tools of statecraft. This school of thought contends that American public diplomacy declined after the Cold War, as evidenced by the demise of the U.S. Information Agency in 1999, and the reduction or elimination of strategic communications programs such as "Voice of America," and Radio Free Europe/Radio Liberty. The remedy, then, according to this view, is to re-engage the world, especially the Arab-Muslim world, by revitalizing both the form and content of U.S. public diplomacy and strategic communications, and by reinforcing those communications with concrete programs that invest in people, create opportunities for positive exchanges, and help build friendships. In fact, Radio Free Europe/Radio Liberty, and its Iraqi component, Radio Free Iraq, and Al-Hurra TV are now actively participating in U.S. strategic communication efforts, though with debatable effectiveness; all this has occurred, in part, by taking resources from Voice of America.

In direct contrast, the second school of thought advocates treating the war of ideas as a "real war," wherein the objective is to destroy the influence and credibility of the opposing ideology, to include neutralizing its chief proponents. This approach sees public diplomacy as an essential, but insufficient tool because it requires too much time to achieve desired results, and does little to aid the immediate efforts of combat forces in the field. For this school of thought, the principal focus of the war of ideas ought to be how to use the ways and means of information warfare to eliminate terrorist groups.

Use during the Cold War

According to Dr. John Lenczowski, former Director of European and Soviet Affairs for the National Security Council during the Reagan administration, 'The Cold War took many forms, including proxy wars, the arms race, nuclear blackmail, economic warfare, subversion, covert operations and the battle for men's minds. While many of these forms had the trappings of traditional conflicts of national interests, there was a dimension to the Cold War that made it unique among wars: it centered around a war of ideas—a war between two alternative political philosophies.

During the Cold War, the United States and other Western powers developed a robust infrastructure for waging a war of ideas against the communist ideology being promulgated by the Soviet Union and its allies. During the administrations of Harry S. Truman and Dwight D. Eisenhower, the so-called golden age of U.S. propaganda, counterpropaganda, and public diplomacy operations, the U.S. government carried out a sophisticated program of overt and covert activities designed to shape public opinion behind the Iron Curtain, within European intellectual and cultural circles, and across the developing world. The United States was able to reach as much as 50–70% of the populations behind the Iron Curtain during the 1950s through their international broadcasting. High-level interest in such operations waned during the 1970s, but received renewed emphasis under President Ronald Reagan, the Great Communicator, who, like Dwight D. Eisenhower, was a firm advocate of the informational component of America's Cold War strategy.

However, with the end of the Cold War official interest once again plummeted. During the 1990s, Congress and the executive branch disparaged informational activities as costly Cold War anachronisms. The budget for State Department informational programs was slashed, and USIA, a quasi-independent body that reported to the secretary of state, was disestablished, and its responsibilities were transferred to a new undersecretary of state for public diplomacy.

Use in the War on Terror

Terrorism is a form of political and psychological warfare; it is protracted, high-intensity propaganda, aimed more at the hearts of the public and the minds of decision makers, and not at the physical victims. There is growing recognition among U.S. government officials, journalists, and analysts of terrorism that defeating al-Qaida— arguably the preeminent challenge to U.S. security—will require far more than neutralizing leaders, disrupting cells, and dismantling networks. The 9/11 Commission concluded in its final report, eliminating al-Qaida as a formidable danger ultimately requires prevailing in the longer term over the ideology that gives rise to Islamist terrorism."

As Akbar Ahmed, a Muslim scholar who holds the Chair of Islamic Studies at American University, explains: Properly understood, this is a war of ideas within Islam—some of them faithful to authentic Islam, but some of them clearly un-Islamic and even blasphemous toward the peaceful and compassionate Allah of the Qur'an.

Waging a blatantly ideological struggle seems unnatural to some Americans. Westerners tend to downplay intangible factors such as ideas, history, and culture as political motivators, preferring instead to stress more concrete driving forces such as personal security and physical well-being.

The United States military has recently begun incorporating a strategic communication into their overall battle operations in the War on Terror, especially in Afghanistan and Iraq. In addition to the military's traditional role of using force they are beginning to use political as well as ideological warfare against the enemy as a method of influencing the local populations into opposing say the Taliban or al Qa'ida. The ancient Chinese philosopher Sun Tzu once said that to fight and conquer in all your battles is not supreme excellence; supreme excellence consists in breaking the enemy's resistance without fighting. The War of Ideas attempts to "break the enemy's resistance."

Terrorists' use of mass media

Users of terror tactics' strategic communications goals are aimed at legitimizing, propagating, and intimidating their audience. Their skillful use of the mass media and the internet has enabled them to keep generating new generations of followers.

Al-Qaida's message, disseminated widely and effectively through all forms of mass media, including the Internet, has a powerful appeal in much of the Muslim world. In 2007, an al-Qaeda spokesman described Osama bin Laden's strategic influence of mass media in the Arab world:

The intensive, sometimes obsessive coverage in the media about a terrorist act generates the desired psychological effect. Terrorist actions are planned and organized in a manner that causes a strategically maximum communicative effect, while requiring minimal resources. The symbiotic relationship between terror events and the media is apparent: the perpetrators would have far less impact without media publicity and the media can hardly be expected to resist reporting. Satellite TV and the internet offers terrorists expanded possibilities of influencing and manipulating audiences.

Methods

For instance in the West's battle against jihadist terrorists:

Notes

See also 
 
Political Warfare
Cultural Diplomacy
Propaganda
Counterterrorism
PSYOP
Information Operations
United States Information Agency
Counterinsurgency
Music and political warfare

References

Further reading 
 This pivotal article clearly defines and describes succinctly four different types of wars of ideas. 

"Fighting the War of Ideas like a Real War" by J. Michael Waller (The Institute of World Politics Press,2007.) 
"The War of Ideas: Jihadism against Democracy" by Walid Phares (Palgrave Macmillan, 2008.)  
"Public Diplomacy: Ideas for the War of Ideas" by Peter Krause and Stephen Van Evera,Middle East Policy Council
The War of Ideas Website 
"Winning the War of Ideas" by Robert R. Reilly
"Debating the War of Ideas" by John Gallagher (Palgrave Macmillan Publishing, 2009.) 
"The Fight is For Democracy: Winning the War of Ideas in America and the World," Edited by George Parker (Harper Collins Books, 2003) 
"Jihadist Terrorist Use of Strategic Communication Management Techniques" by Dr. Carsten Bockstette 
Gendron, Angela, "Trends in Terrorism Series: Al-Qaeda: Propaganda and Media Strategy"
Lachow, Irving & Richardson, Courtney, "The Terrorist Use of the Internet—The Real Story", JFQ, Issue 45, 2nd Quarter 2007. 
Lynch, Marc, "Al-Qaeda’s Media Strategies", National Interest Online, January 3, 2006.
Whitlock, Craig, "Keeping al-Qaeda in His Grip Al-Zawahiri Presses Ideology, Deepens Rifts among Islamic Radicals", Washington Post Foreign Service. Sunday, April 16, 2006.

External links
 Security Freedom Radio
 PBS, FRONTLINE/ World News, "War of Ideas"
Admiral Mike Mullen, Chairman of the Joint Chiefs of Staff (CJCS), "US Military Losing 'War of Ideas,'" 
 Shaihk Abu Yahya Libi of al Qaeda is interviewed by their media outlet as-Sahab on their attempt to win the "War of Ideas"
Office of the Director of National Intelligence, "Letter from al-Zawahiri to al-Zarqawi". October 11, 2005.

Cold War terminology
Diplomacy
Mass media
Political concepts
War on terror